Pietro Prisco Guglielmucci (died 1539) was a Roman Catholic prelate who served as Bishop of Lavello (1515–1539).

Biography
On 10 December 1515, Pietro Prisco Guglielmucci was appointed by Pope Leo X as Bishop of Lavello. 
He served as Bishop of Lavello until his death in June 1539.

While bishop, he was the principal consecrator of Andrés Clemente de Torrecremata, Bishop of Duvno.

References

External links and additional sources
 (Chronology of Bishops) 
 (Chronology of Bishops) 

16th-century Italian Roman Catholic bishops
1539 deaths
Bishops appointed by Pope Leo X